John Giles (c. 1533 – 1606), of Totnes and Bowden, Devon, was an English politician.

He was a Member (MP) of the Parliament of England for Totnes in 1586.

References

1530s births
1606 deaths
English MPs 1586–1587
Members of the Parliament of England (pre-1707) for Totnes